The Niagara Catholic District School Board (Niagara Catholic or NCDSB, previously known as English-language Separate District School Board No. 50 prior to 1999)  is the publicly funded Catholic school board in the Regional Municipality of Niagara which is located in Ontario Canada supporting the municipalities of Fort Erie, Grimsby, Lincoln & West Lincoln, Niagara Falls, Niagara-on-the-Lake, Pelham, Port Colborne, St. Catharines, Thorold, Wainfleet and Welland. Its head office, the Catholic Education Centre, is located in Welland, Ontario, Canada.

The board consists of 49 elementary schools, 8 secondary schools, and a number of other education & administrative centres in the 12 aforementioned area municipalities that make up the Niagara Region. The Niagara Catholic District School Board serves over 24,000 students (elementary, secondary, adult education & summer) each year. Niagara Catholic is governed by a board of 8 elected trustees.

History
In January, 1997 the Minister of Education and Training for the Province of Ontario announced that, as part of its plan to restructure the education system in Ontario, the number of school boards in the province would be reduced from 129 to 66 and replaced by new “District” school boards, effective January 1, 1998.

As part of the amalgamation of school boards, the Welland County Roman Catholic Separate School Board and the Lincoln County Roman Catholic Separate School Board became the Niagara Catholic District School Board, on January 1, 1998.

The Niagara Catholic District School Board covers an area of 1868 sq. km and is responsible for providing Catholic education to approximately 22,500 students in the Niagara Region.

On June 15, 2010 the Niagara Catholic District School Board approved a new Mission Statement for Niagara Catholic.

Niagara Catholic’s first mission statement was introduced shortly after the amalgamation of the former Welland and Lincoln County Roman Catholic Separate School Boards in 1998. The mission statement was the result of a planning process that involved more than 100 representatives of Catholic education who came together to begin the process for the newly established Niagara Catholic District School Board.

In the fall of 2008, Niagara Catholic initiated a two-year Vision 2020 strategic planning process. More than 4,700 stakeholders, including students, staff, parents, religious, Catholic School Councils, organisations and members of the Catholic community were invited to participate and provide input through 160 discovery sessions. Data from the discovery sessions was then analyzed by more than 80 participants at a strategic planning summit. Recommendations from the discovery sessions and the summit included re-writing the mission statement, a series of vision statements and the strategic directions for Niagara Catholic. On May 25, 2010, the Board approved the vision statements, the strategic directions and a recommendation to vet a new mission statement. The revised mission statement was vetted to all stakeholders prior to being submitted to the Board for consideration on June 15, 2010.

Eleven years after introducing its first mission statement, on June 15, 2010, as part of the Board’s Vision 2020 strategic plan, the Niagara Catholic District School Board approved the new mission statement.

Secondary schools

Elementary schools

See also
 District School Board of Niagara
List of school districts in Ontario
List of high schools in Ontario

References

External links

 Niagara Catholic District School Board website

Education in the Regional Municipality of Niagara
Education in Welland
Roman Catholic school districts in Ontario